Benedetto is a common Italian name, the equivalent of the English name Benedict. Notable people named Benedetto include:

People with the given name

 Benedetto Accolti (disambiguation), several people
 Benedetto Aloi (1935–2011), American mobster
 Benedetto Antelami (c. 1150–c. 1230), Italian architect and sculptor
 Benedetto Bonfigli (c. 1420–c. 1490), Italian painter
 Benedetto Bordone (1460–1531), Italian manuscript editor, miniaturist and cartographer
 Benedetto Brin (1833–1898), Italian naval administrator and politician
 Benedetto Cairoli (1825–1889), Italian statesman
 Benedetto Castelli (1578–1643), Italian mathematician
 Benedetto Cotrugli (1416–1469), Ragusan merchant, economist, scientist, diplomat and humanist
 Benedetto Croce (1866–1952), Italian philosopher and politician
 Benedetto da Maiano (1442–1497), Italian sculptor
 Benedetto Della Vedova (born 1962), Italian politician
 Benedetto Dei (1417–1492), Italian poet and historian
 Benedetto Ferrari (c. 1600–1681), Italian composer
 Benedetto I Zaccaria (c. 1230–1307), Italian admiral
 Benedetto Justiniani (1550–1622), Italian theologian
 Benedetto Luti (1666–1724), Italian painter
 Benedetto Marcello (1686–1739), Italian composer, writer, advocate, magistrate, and teacher
 Benedetto Pistrucci (1783–1855), Italian engraver
 Benedetto Santapaola (born 1938), Italian  mafioso 
 Benedetto Spera (born 1934), Italian  mafioso 
 Benedetto Stay (1714–1801), Croatian Roman Catholic churchman
 Benedetto Varchi (c. 1500–1565), Italian humanist, historian, and poet

People with the middle name
 Antonio Benedetto Carpano (1764–1815), Italian distiller
 Giovanni Benedetto Castiglione (1609–1664), Italian artist, painter, printmaker, and draftsman
 Giuseppe Benedetto Cottolengo (1786–1842), Italian saint
 Stefano Benedetto Pallavicino (1672–1742), Italian poet

People with the surname
 Anthony Dominick Benedetto (born 1926),  Italian-American singer
 John Benedetto (born 1939), American mathematician
 Robert Benedetto (born 1946), American luthier
 Darío Benedetto, (born 1990) Argentine footballer
 Enzo Benedetto (1905-1993), Italian painter

See also
 Di Benedetto
 San Benedetto (disambiguation)

Italian masculine given names
Surnames